William A. Clark (born March 4, 1958) is an American politician. He was a member of the Maryland House of Delegates, representing District 35A from 1983 to 1990.

Early life
William A. Clark was born on March 4, 1958, in Havre de Grace, Maryland. He attended Bel Air High School in Bel Air, Maryland. He also attended Harford Community College.

Career
Clark worked as a vice president of Clark Sales and Service.

Clark served in the Maryland House of Delegates from 1983 to 1990. He represented District 35A and was elected as a Republican.

References

Living people
1958 births
People from Havre de Grace, Maryland
Republican Party members of the Maryland House of Delegates
20th-century American politicians